Grafham railway station was a railway station in Grafham, Cambridgeshire. The station and its line closed in 1959.

In the 1990s the railway station buildings still stood and were lived in. The area around the old platform (known in the village as 'the scrapyard') had been used to dispose of old machinery and other debris as can be seen in the background of the view in 1995. The platform itself was still clearly visible. Since then the site was cleared, buildings demolished, and a row of new houses built on the land.

References

External links
 Grafham station on navigable 1946 O. S. map

Disused railway stations in Cambridgeshire
Former Midland Railway stations
Railway stations in Great Britain opened in 1866
Railway stations in Great Britain closed in 1959
1866 establishments in England